Harmony Books is an imprint of the Crown Publishing Group, itself part of publisher Penguin Random House. It was founded by Bruce Harris, a Crown executive, in 1972.

The imprint has been used for such books as:
Jill Freedman, Circus Days (1975).
Mark Lewisohn, The Beatles Recording Sessions (1988).
Leni Riefenstahl, Vanishing Africa (1982).
Stephen Jay Gould, Full House: The Spread of Excellence from Plato to Darwin (1996).

Harmony Books is currently focused on books about personal transformation, well-being, health, relationships, self-improvement, and spirituality. Books and authors include Master Your Metabolism by Jillian Michaels, Change Your Brain, Change Your Body by Daniel G. Amen, The Dukan Diet, Deepak Chopra, The 4-Hour Workweek and The 4-Hour Body by Timothy Ferriss, eighteen books with Suzanne Somers, Queen Bees & Wannabes and Masterminds & Wingmen by Rosalind Wiseman and multiple books with the Dalai Lama.

Some recent books
Ageless Body, Timeless Mind, Deepak Chopra
Suzanne Somers' Eat Great Lose Weight, Suzanne Somers
The Seven Principles for Making Marriage Work, John Gottman and Nan Silver
Cesar's Way, Cesar Millan and Melissa Jo Peltier
Anatomy of Spirit, Carolyn Myss
Change Your Brain, Change Your Life, Daniel Amen
Master Your Metabolism, Jillian Michaels
The 4-Hour Body, Timothy Ferris
The Fast Metabolism Diet, Haylie Pomroy

References

External links

Book publishing company imprints
Random House
Publishing companies established in 1972